The following is a timeline of the COVID-19 pandemic in Malaysia during 2023.

Timeline

January

On 3 January, Health Minister Dr Zaliha Mustafa announced several meausres to curb rising cases as travel increased including testing all overseas travellers for fever and offering walk-in vaccinations at hospitals and clinics from 9 January.

On 4 January, Sabah's State Local Government and Housing Minister Datuk Seri Masidi Manjun announced that all travellers from China would have to be fully vaccinated against COVID-19 and had to present a negative COVID-19 test.

On 10 January, the Ministry of Health confirmed that the Immigration Department would be screening travellers from China for COVID-19 in response to an outbreak in China. 

On 12 January, Menteri Besar of Selangor Datuk Seri Amirudin Shari stated that the Selangor state government was considering stepping up COVID-19 prevention measures including contact tracing measures if the number of cases in the state rose. He also encouraged residents to take booster doses. That same day, Dr Mustafa confirmed that  Malaysia would not be closing its borders since the COVID-19 situation in the country was under control. However, border screenings would continue.

On 13 January, the states of Sarawak and Kedah began screening the temperatures of travellers entering their borders.

On 27 January, The Star reported that Penang state had only reported a total of 235 new cases between 12 and 25 January 2023. Only one of the state's 92 mukim (or sub-districts) remained a red-zone.

On 29 January, the Ministry of Health confirmed that 9,088 of the 9,480 active cases were undergoing home quarantine. In addition 371 individuals (3.9%) were hospitalised with 21 of these cases undergoing intensive care.

February

On 10 February, Health Minister Mustafa confirmed that the Health Ministry would establish a task force to write a White Paper on the COVID-19 vaccine procurement practices of previous Malaysian governments.

On 13 February, Director-General of Health Noor Hisham Abdullah confirmed that COVID-19 data would potentially be released on a weekly rather than daily basis from March 2023. 

On 16 February, the Sabah state government confirmed that it would change the frequency of its COVID-19 statements from daily updates to weekly updates issued on Monday.

March

On 4 March, Health Minister Zainal Mustafa confirmed that three COVID-19 cases had been detected among flood victims in the state of Johor and quarantined in hospitals.

References

2023
2023 in Malaysia